Hawkesbury Meadow is a 3.3 hectare biological Site of Special Scientific Interest (SSSI) in South Gloucestershire, notified in 1987.

Sources

 English Nature citation sheet for the site (accessed on 16 July 2006)

Sites of Special Scientific Interest in Avon
South Gloucestershire District
Sites of Special Scientific Interest notified in 1987
Meadows in Gloucestershire